Bisan-dong (비산동, 飛山洞) is neighborhood of Dongan district in the city of Anyang, Gyeonggi Province, South Korea. It is officially divided into Bisan-1-dong, Bisan-2-dong and Bisan-3-dong.

It is placed in the north, middle side of Anyang-si, and it is right below the Gwanak Mountain, or Gwanaksan.

External links
 Bisan-1-dong 
 Bisan-2-dong 
 Bisan-3-dong 

Dongan-gu
Neighbourhoods in Anyang, Gyeonggi